Szczepan Sadurski is a polish satirist, cartoonist, caricaturist, journalist, leader of the Partia Dobrego Humoru (Good Humor Party). He was born in 1965 in Lublin, and graduated from art secondary school (1985). He has published more than 5 thousand drawings in 200 magazines. Winner of awards, including the Golden Szpilka ‘86 (prize from the magazine “Szpilki” for the year's best drawing). Founder of Wydawnictwo Humoru i Satyry (Humour and Satire Publishing) Superpress (1991), editor in chief of the magazine Dobry Humor. Founder and leader of the Partia Dobrego Humoru (Good Humor Party) - an informal, international organization for people who love laughing (more than three thousand members in Poland and other countries). The owner of the Sadurski.com satirical web portal. He has been a juror in many satirical and cabaret competitions in Poland, as well as in Turkey and Sweden. He lives in the Polish capital, Warsaw.

References 

 Sadurski.com
 Rysunki.pl

1965 births
Polish cartoonists
Polish caricaturists
Polish draughtsmen
Living people